Animal Control is an American sitcom that premiered on February 16, 2023 on Fox. Animal Control is produced by Roughhouse Productions, Middletown News, Wow a Fox and Fox Entertainment Studios.

Premise
A group of Animal Control workers in Seattle begin to see their lives complicated by humans and not so much by animals.

Cast
 Joel McHale as Frank Shaw, a disillusioned and emotionally-distant Senior Animal Control Officer. His bad attitude stems from once being a cop but was sacked after finding evidence of corruption among his force. He frequently belittles his new partner Shred and acts like a total jerk to the rest of his precinct.
 Vella Lovell as Emily Price, the good-natured Human Resources director at the A.C. precinct. She often tries to improve her career and get a more well-paying job, but is constantly stone-walled by Commissioner Dudge and the others do not want her to leave on account of how easy it is to take advantage of her.
 Michael Rowland as Fred "Shred·" Taylor, Frank's new partner. An idealistic amateur Animal Control officer and a former professional snowboarder. His unbound idealism causes him to deflect the negativity that his precinct often dishes out, but just barely.
 Ravi V. Patel as Amit Patel, one of the Animal Control officers of Frank's precinct. He has two daughters who are mostly used for the jokes revolving around his family life. 
 Grace Palmer as Victoria Sands, a street-smart Animal Control officer from New Zealand and Amit's partner. She is often seen helping Amit come out of his shell in order to do his job. Next to Frank, she takes her job seriously.
 Gerry Dee as Commissioner Templeton Dudge, the mean-spirited commissioner of the Seattle Animal Control Officers. He would gladly go out of his way to taunt and harass Frank's precinct due to their less-than-stellar record of handling animals. More often than not, the precinct would gladly give the abuse back.
 Kelli Ogmundson as Dolores Stubb, the self-righteous receptionist of Frank's precinct. She has a tendency to meddle with the officers' affairs for prideful reasons. As a result, she is disliked by the officers, who take every opportunity to drag her through the coals.
 Alvina August as Dr. Summers, the attractive veterinarian in Frank's precinct. She is often targeted as a lust object by the officers, which is a recurring joke in the show.

Episodes

Production
In July 2022, it was announced Fox had given a straight-to-series order to Animal Control from  Bob Fisher, Rob Greenberg, Dan Sterling and Fox Entertainment, marking Fox Entertainment Studios' first fully owned live-action comedy. In October of that year, Joel McHale joined the series as the lead and executive producer. Vella Lovell and Ravi Patel joined the cast later that same month.  Most portions of Animal Control are lensed in and around Vancouver, the most populous city in British Columbia, and were filmed in the Vancouver area from October 31, 2022 to January 25, 2023.

Reception

Critical response
The review aggregator website Rotten Tomatoes reported a 60% approval rating with an average rating of 6/10, based on 10 critic reviews. Metacritic, which uses a weighted average, assigned a score of 68 out of 100 based on 7 critics, indicating "generally favorable reviews".

PETA response
The show has been criticized by PETA for using live animals on the set rather than CGI, VFX or other technology.

Ratings

References

External links
 
 

2020s American sitcoms
2023 American television series debuts
Fox Broadcasting Company original programming
English-language television shows
Television series about animals
Television series by Fox Entertainment